Boghești is a commune located in Vrancea County, Romania. It is composed of nine villages: Boghești, Bogheștii de Sus, Bichești, Prisecani, Tăbucești, Pleșești, Iugani, Chițcani and Plăcințeni.

References

Communes in Vrancea County
Localities in Western Moldavia